Mont-Tremblant/Lac Duhamel Water Aerodrome  was located  northwest of Mont-Tremblant, Quebec, Canada.

See also
 Mont-Tremblant/Lac Ouimet Water Aerodrome
 Mont-Tremblant/Saint-Jovite Airport
 Lac Gagnon Water Aerodrome

References

Defunct seaplane bases in Quebec